Ali El Omari (born 27 June 1978) is a former footballer. Born in France, he represented Morocco at international level.

Club career
El Omari previously played for US Créteil-Lusitanos in the French Ligue 2.

References

External links
 
 
 

1978 births
Living people
French footballers
Moroccan footballers
Morocco international footballers
Association football midfielders
US Joué-lès-Tours players
Football Bourg-en-Bresse Péronnas 01 players
S.C. Espinho players
Gil Vicente F.C. players
Boavista F.C. players
G.D. Estoril Praia players
S.C. Beira-Mar players
Apollon Pontou FC players
C.S. Marítimo players
US Créteil-Lusitanos players
Nea Salamis Famagusta FC players
AEK Larnaca FC players
Cypriot Second Division players
French expatriate footballers
Moroccan expatriate footballers
Expatriate footballers in Portugal
Expatriate footballers in Greece
Expatriate footballers in Cyprus
French sportspeople of Moroccan descent
Moroccan expatriate sportspeople in Portugal
Moroccan expatriate sportspeople in Greece
Moroccan expatriate sportspeople in Cyprus
French expatriate sportspeople in Portugal
French expatriate sportspeople in Greece
French expatriate sportspeople in Cyprus
People from Châteaudun
Sportspeople from Eure-et-Loir
Footballers from Centre-Val de Loire